John J. Lyons (c. 1881 – February 27, 1945) was the Secretary of State of the State of New York.

Biography
He was the Republican district leader in Harlem. He was an alternate delegate to the 1916 Republican National Convention, and a delegate to the 1920 Republican National Convention. He was Secretary of State of New York from 1921 to 1922, elected in 1920. He died at the United States Veterans Hospital in the Bronx.

References

Further reading
Political Graveyard
The theft from the Broadway Savings Institution, in NYT on July 14, 1918
List of delegates to RNC, in NYT on March 8, 1920

Secretaries of State of New York (state)
1880s births
1945 deaths
Politicians from New York City
New York (state) Republicans
20th-century American politicians